Gastrotheca albolineata (common name: white-lined treefrog) is a frog species in family Hemiphractidae. It is endemic to southeastern Brazil and known from São Paulo, Rio de Janeiro, and Espírito Santo states at elevations of  asl.

Gastrotheca albolineata is a canopy dweller in primary and old secondary rainforests. It requires big trees as its habitat. Females carry the eggs on their back, and eggs develop directly to froglets.

It is a common species but difficult to observe. It is not considered threatened by the International Union for Conservation of Nature (IUCN), but deforestation and agricultural encroachment are localized threats.

References

albolineata
Endemic fauna of Brazil
Amphibians of Brazil
Taxa named by Bertha Lutz
Taxa named by Adolfo Lutz
Taxonomy articles created by Polbot
Amphibians described in 1939